Gore od ljubavi (English: Worse Than Love) is the twelfth studio album by Serbian singer Ceca. It was released on 24 May 2004.

Track listing

Personnel
Author: Ljiljana Jorgovanović, Marina Tucaković
Art Direction - Orange Studio
Art Director - Dejan Milićević
Photographer - Nebojša Babić
Stylist - Boško Jakovljević
Make up Artist - Dragan Vurdelja
Hair Stylist - Svetlana Bubanja - Bucka
Brand Direction - Raka Marić at Music Star Production
Public Relations - Sreten Radović
Management - Raka Marić

Music videos
Gore od ljubavi
Trula višnja

Release history

References

2004 albums
Ceca (singer) albums